Melichares is a genus of mites in the family Ascidae.

Species
 Melichares aciculatus (Ishikawa, 1968)      
 Melichares agilis Hering, 1838      
 Melichares algonquian (Lindquist & King-Wan-W, 1991)      
 Melichares californicus (Lindquist & King-Wan-W, 1991)      
 Melichares crassispinus Ma, Zhang & Li, 2003      
 Melichares disparisetus (Lindquist & King-Wan-W, 1991)      
 Melichares mexicanus (Lindquist & King-Wan-W, 1991)      
 Melichares monochami (Lindquist, 1962)      
 Melichares nipponensis (Lindquist & King-Wan-W, 1991)      
 Melichares sibiriensis Davydova, 1988      
 Melichares squamosus (Lindquist & King-Wan-W, 1991)

References

Ascidae